Abdullah Gül (born 29 October 1950) is a Turkish politician who served as the 11th President of Turkey, in office from 2007 to 2014. He previously served for four months as Prime Minister from 2002 to 2003, and concurrently served as both Deputy Prime Minister and as Foreign Minister between 2003 and 2007. He is currently a member of the Advisory Panel for the President of the Islamic Development Bank.

Advocating staunch Islamist political views during his university years, Gül became a Member of Parliament for Kayseri in 1991 and was re-elected in 1995, 1999, 2002 and 2007. Initially a member of the Islamist Welfare Party, Gül joined the Virtue Party in 1998 after the former was banned for anti-secular activities. When the party split into hardline Islamist and modernist factions in 2000, Gül joined fellow party member Recep Tayyip Erdoğan in advocating the need for reform and moderation. He ran against serving leader Recai Kutan for the Virtue Party leadership at a time when Erdoğan was banned from holding political office. As the candidate for the modernist camp, he came second with 521 votes while Kutan won 633. He co-founded the moderate Justice and Development Party (AKP) with Erdoğan in 2001 after the Virtue Party was shut down in the same year, while hardline conservative members founded the Felicity Party instead.

Gül became Prime Minister after the AKP won a landslide victory in the 2002 general election while Erdoğan was still banned from office. His government removed Erdoğan's political ban by March 2003, after which Erdoğan became an MP for Siirt in a by-election and took over as Prime Minister. Gül subsequently served as Minister of Foreign Affairs and Deputy Prime Minister until 2007. His subsequent bid for the Presidency drew strong and highly vocal opposition from ardent supporters of secularism in Turkey and was initially blocked by the Constitutional Court due to concerns over his Islamist political background. He was eventually elected Turkey's first President with a background in Islamic politics after the 2007 snap general election.

As President, Gül came under criticism for giving assent to controversial laws which have been regarded by the political opposition as unconstitutional. In June 2013, he signed a bill restricting alcohol consumption into law despite initially indicating a possible veto, which was seen as a contributing factor to sparking the Gezi Park protests. Other controversies included a law tightening internet regulation in 2013, a law increasing political control over the judiciary in 2014 designed to protect then Prime Minister Erdoğan and others from corruption charges and a law giving the National Intelligence Organization (MİT) controversial new powers also in 2014. Gül took a mediating approach during the Gezi Park anti-government protests and government corruption scandals.

Since leaving office, Gül has progressively become more publicly critical of his successor, Erdoğan, and the democratic backsliding in Turkey. He was mooted as a potential joint opposition candidate in the 2018 Turkish presidential election, initially supported by the Republican People's Party (CHP) and the Felicity Party (SP). However, having failed to gain the support of the third major opposition party, namely the Good Party, Gül announced that he had taken his name out of consideration due to the lack of universal opposition-backing. He has since been involved, though not officially, with the Democracy and Progress Party (DEVA) of fellow former AKP member Ali Babacan.

Early life 
Gül was born in Kayseri, central Anatolia on 29 October 1950, the 27th anniversary of the proclamation of Turkish independence, also known as Republic Day in Turkey. His father is Ahmet Hamdi Gül, a retired air force mechanic, and his mother is Adviye Satoğlu.

Education
Gül studied Economics at Istanbul University. During his graduate education, he spent two years (1976–1978) in London and studied at the University of Exeter in the United Kingdom. Returning to Turkey in 1978, he became an instructor in the Department of Industrial Engineering at Sakarya University while working on his doctoral research on Turkey's economic relations with other Muslim countries. He received his PhD from Istanbul University in 1983. Between 1983 and 1991, he worked at the Islamic Development Bank (IDB) in Jeddah, Saudi Arabia. He was conferred an honorary PhD degree from Amity University, Noida on 8 February 2009, and a LL.D from the University of Dhaka on 13 February 2010.

Entry into politics
Gül became acquainted with politics early during his high school years. During his university education, he became a member of the Islamist-nationalist Millî Türk Talebe Birliği (National Turkish Students' Union) in the line of Necip Fazıl's Büyük Doğu (Grand Orient) current.

He was elected a member of the Turkish parliament for the Refah Partisi (RP, "the Welfare Party") from the Kayseri electoral district in 1991 and 1995. During these years, he made statements about the political system of Turkey that was designed by Mustafa Kemal Atatürk and the Turkish National Movement, which included "This is the end of the republican period" and "The secular system has failed and we definitely want to change it". These statements caused controversy when his candidacy for the 2007 presidential election was announced by Prime Minister Recep Tayyip Erdoğan.

In 1999, he kept his seat as a member of the Fazilet Partisi (FP, "the Virtue Party") which was subsequently outlawed by the Constitutional Court for its violation of the Constitution.  Its predecessor, the Refah Partisi, was also outlawed by the Constitutional Court for its violation of the Constitution, especially the principle of secularism. By this time, Gül had apparently moderated his views and was reportedly considered to be part of the Virtue Party's reformist faction. Since 1993 in Ankara, he had been organizing an informal think-tank  involving a group of Refah politicians who were discontented with the leadership of Necmettin Erbakan: these included Melih Gökçek, Bülent Arınç, Abdüllatif Şener, Recep Tayyip Erdoğan and Beşir Atalay. In August 2001, this group founded the Adalet ve Kalkınma Partisi (Justice and Development Party), a party which billed itself as a moderate conservative party in the European tradition. He was elected once again to represent Kayseri in 2002.

An interview he gave in 2002 summarizes his criticisms of the Refah Partisi under the leadership of Necmettin Erbakan and his portrayal of the AKP as a moderate party:In the Welfare Party, there were groups demanding sharia rule. Welfare did not represent the local values we are now cultivating. The ideology of the party was partially shaped by alien imports. [He was referring to the impact of the Islamist ideology of the Iranian Revolution and Arab states on Welfare's ideology.] Our vision was at odds with the rest of the party. The despotic rule of Erbakan Hoca made it impossible for us to realize our vision under the rubric of the National View. We believe that modernization and being Muslim complement each other. We accept the modern values of liberalism, human rights, and market economy.

AKP career

Prime minister

After the Justice and Development Party (AKP) won the most votes in the November 2002 general election, Gül was appointed Prime Minister, as AKP leader Recep Tayyip Erdoğan was still banned from participating in politics. After Gül's government secured legislation allowing Erdoğan's return to politics, the latter took over as prime minister on 14 March 2003.  Gül was appointed deputy prime minister and foreign minister.

Foreign minister
After becoming foreign minister in March 2003, Gül became the key player in Turkey's attempts to receive an accession date for the European Union and in its attempts to improve relations with Syria and maintaining its relationship with the Turkic-speaking countries of Central Asia and the Caucasus.  On 8 January 2008, Gül flew to the United States to meet with U.S. President George W. Bush and U.S. Secretary of State Condoleezza Rice.

Presidency: 2007–2014

Prime Minister Erdoğan announced on 24 April 2007 that Gül would be the Justice and Development Party candidate in the 2007 presidential election. Previously, there had been speculation that Erdoğan himself would be the party's candidate, which had provoked substantial opposition from secularists. When a boycott of opposition parties in Parliament deadlocked the election process, Gül formally withdrew his candidacy on 6 May 2007. If elected he would be the first president to have been involved with Islamist parties. But a few days later, on 11 May 2007 when he inquired after the alterations to the Turkish constitution which now allowed the people to elect the president directly rather than a parliamentary vote, Gül announced that he was still intending to run.

Following the July 2007 parliamentary election, the AKP renominated Gül as its presidential candidate on 13 August; the election was again held as a vote of parliament. On 14 August, Gül submitted his candidacy application to parliament and expressed his commitment to secularism at a news conference.

On 28 August 2007, he was elected president in the third round of voting; in the first two rounds, a two-thirds majority of MPs had been required, but in the third round he needed only a simple majority. Gül was sworn in immediately thereafter. The process was a very low-key affair.

Gül's swearing-in was not attended by the Chief of the Turkish General Staff and was boycotted by the opposition Republican People's Party; then the hand-over of power at the presidential palace was held behind closed doors. Gül's wife was not present. The traditional evening reception hosted by the new president at the presidential palace for the country's highest authorities was announced for 11:30 in the morning and wives were not invited.

His presidency was described as a "new era in Turkish politics", for being the first president of Turkey with a background in Islamic politics.

Gül received messages of congratulation from the US, EU and German authorities while Turkey's prime minister Tayyip Erdoğan made a statement saying "a structure doomed to uncertainty has been overcome".

In September 2008 Gül became the first Turkish leader to visit Armenia where, in meetings with President Serzh Sarkisian, the two leaders formulated a solution to the tendentious problem of the genocide question, sparking a major debate in Turkey, but both the Armenian and Turkish parliaments refused to ratify the agreement. In November 2011, President Gül led a state visit to the United Kingdom as a guest of Queen Elizabeth II. The President met political and business leaders, visited the Olympic Park and was guest of honor at a state banquet at Buckingham Palace.

In November 2013, Gül called on Muslim countries to fight against what he called Islamophobia during his address at the 29th session of the COMCEC in Istanbul. he said:Islamophobia remains a critical problem, which instigates unsubstantial prejudices against our region and Muslims. Terror plays a role in the persistence of such problems. We have to combat any form of deviation playing into the hands of people who equate terrorism with Islam, the religion of love, tolerance and conciliation.

Statements on the Middle East

Gül has been a critic of Israel and Western countries which established relations with Israel at the expense of Palestine. After the Israeli raid on the MV Mavi Marmara in 2010, he advocated the complete ending of diplomatic relations with Israel, stating that "Israel will turn into a complete apartheid regime in the next 50 years if it does not allow for the establishment of an independent and proud Palestinian state with its capital in east Jerusalem. That is why we are exerting efforts to achieve a fair peace with a strategic point of view, which is to Israel's own interests."

On 31 December 2012, he stated with respect to the Arab spring and democratization of the Arab world: "But democracy is not only about elections. The task of creating essential democratic institutions – the rule of law, habits of accountability, gender equality, and freedom of expression and faith – still awaits these countries".

History of titles
 1949–1983: Abdullah Gül
 1983–1991: Dr. Abdullah Gül
 1991–1996: Assoc. Prof. Dr. Abdullah Gül, MP
 1996–1997: Assoc. Prof. Dr. Abdullah Gül, Minister of State of Turkey
 2002–2003: His Excellency Assoc. Prof. Dr. Abdullah Gül, Prime Minister of Turkey
 2003–2007: His Excellency Assoc. Prof. Dr. Abdullah Gül, Deputy Prime Minister and Minister of Foreign Affairs of Turkey
 2007–2014: His Excellency Assoc. Prof. Dr. Abdullah Gül, President of the Republic of Turkey

Honors and medals

National honors

Foreign honors

See also
 Çankaya Köşkü The Presidency of the Republic of Turkey
 List of presidential trips made by Abdullah Gül
 Abdullah Gul Interchange

References

External links
 
 Presidency of the Republic of Turkey
 Abdullah Gul News Index
 https://twitter.com/cbabdullahgul

|-

|-

|-

|-

1950 births
Living people
21st-century prime ministers of Turkey
21st-century presidents of Turkey
Alumni of the University of Exeter
Deputy Prime Ministers of Turkey
Honorary Knights Grand Cross of the Order of the Bath
Justice and Development Party (Turkey) politicians
Istanbul University alumni
Ministers of Foreign Affairs of Turkey
People from Kayseri
Presidents of Turkey
Prime Ministers of Turkey
Recipients of the Heydar Aliyev Order
Turkish Sunni Muslims
Virtue Party politicians
Welfare Party politicians
Grand Collars of the Order of Prince Henry
Grand Crosses with Chain of the Order of Merit of the Republic of Hungary (civil)
Knights Grand Cross with Collar of the Order of Merit of the Italian Republic
Recipients of the Order of Valour
Recipients of St. George's Order of Victory
Members of the 23rd Parliament of Turkey
Members of the 22nd Parliament of Turkey
Members of the 21st Parliament of Turkey
Members of the 20th Parliament of Turkey
Members of the 54th government of Turkey
Ministers of State of Turkey